Uthangarai is a state assembly constituency in Tamil Nadu, India, that was formed after constituency delimitation in 2007. Its State Assembly Constituency number is 51. The seat is reserved for candidates from the Scheduled Castes. It comprises a portion. Located in Krishnagiri district, it consists of Uthangarai taluk and a portion of Pochampalli taluk. It is included in the Krishnagiri parliamentary constituency. It is one of the 234 State Legislative Assembly Constituencies in Tamil Nadu in India.

Members of the Legislative assembly

Election results

2021

2016

2011

References

Assembly constituencies of Tamil Nadu
Krishnagiri district